Top Gear is a racing game for the Super Nintendo Entertainment System, published by Kemco and developed by Gremlin Graphics in 1992. The objective of the game is to become the fastest driver in the world by racing other drivers across several nations

It marks the first game in the Top Gear racing game franchise, and it is one of the first racing games to be released on the Super NES. This game and its next two sequels were created by the same developers as the similar Lotus series of games released earlier on the Amiga and Mega Drive.

Gameplay 

When players first start the game, they are given several options to choose from, including entering their name, a choice of four different controller layouts, a choice between automatic or manual transmission, and their choice of four unique cars. During the race, the player will have to steer and shift gears (if they chose a manual transmission). The player is also given control over three "nitros", which allow the player to increase their speed for a short period of time. The game features a password save system, made up of automotive terms such as "gear box" and "oilcloth". Each password grants access to another country to race in. During the race, there are pits in which players must stop in order to refuel. If their car runs out of fuel and coasts to a stop before the race is finished, the player will be disqualified.

Development and release 

The music in Top Gear mostly consists of remixed tracks from the Lotus series of racing games on the Amiga produced by Barry Leitch. For example, the title music of Top Gear is taken from the ending of Lotus Turbo Challenge 2, and the third race of each country uses a remixed version of the Lotus Esprit Turbo Challenge title theme.

The game (under the title Top Racer), along with several other retro titles, was released by Piko Interactive on a multi-cart for the Evercade handheld gaming system in 2020.

Reception 

Top Gear was met with positive reception from critics and reviewers alike since its release.

Legacy 

The game became very popular in Latin America, specially in Brazil. It inspired Brazilian company Aquiris Game Studio to create the arcade racing game Horizon Chase - World Tour, which features an original soundtrack scored by Top Gear composer Barry Leitch, who also contributes an unlockable remix of the Top Gear main title theme.

Notes

References

External links 
 Top Gear at GameFAQs
 Top Gear at Giant Bomb
 Top Gear at MobyGames

1992 video games
Evercade games
Gremlin Interactive games
Kemco games
Multiplayer and single-player video games
Super Nintendo Entertainment System games
Top Gear (video game series)
Video games scored by Barry Leitch
Video games set in Brazil
Video games set in California
Video games set in Europe
Video games set in France
Video games set in Germany
Video games set in Italy
Video games set in Japan
Video games set in Mexico
Video games set in Nevada
Video games set in New York City
Video games set in Peru
Video games set in South America
Video games set in the Las Vegas Valley
Video games set in the United Kingdom
Video games developed in the United Kingdom